Smoking Room is a 2002 Spanish film written and directed by Julio D. Wallovits and Roger Gual.

Plot 
The plot concerns the miseries and intrigues unravelling among the employees of a company ensuing with the decision taken by one of them (Ramírez) to file a request for the creation of a smoking room in the office.

Cast

Production 
The film was produced by El Sindicato alongside  and DeAPlaneta.

Release 
The film screened at the Málaga Film Festival. Distributed by DeAPlaneta, it was theatrically released in Spain on 14 June 2002.

Reception 
Mirito Torreiro of Fotogramas rated the film 4 out of 5 stars, extolling the dialogues, "the best ones heard in a Spanish film for many years".

Jonathan Holland of Variety presented Smoking Room as a "low-budget, high-talent debut" that is "a witty X-ray of male office workers living their lives in quiet (and not so quiet) desperation".

Accolades 

|-
| rowspan = "4" align = "center" | 2002 || rowspan = "3" | 5th Málaga Film Festival || Best Screenplay || ||  || rowspan = "3"  | 
|-
| Best Male Performance || The entire (male) cast || 
|-
| colspan = "2" | Jury's Special Prize || 
|-
| 15th European Film Awards || colspan = "2" | European Discovery of the Year ||  || 
|-
| align = "center" rowspan = "2" | 2003 || rowspan = "2" | 17th Goya Awards || Best New Director || Julio Wallovits, Roger Gual ||  || rowspan = "2" | 
|-
| Best Original Screenplay || Julio Wallovits, Roger Gual || 
|}

See also 
 List of Spanish films of 2002

References 

2000s Spanish-language films
Spanish drama films
2002 drama films
2000s Spanish films